Carlo Gambino (August 24, 1902 – October 15, 1976) was an Italian-American crime boss of the Gambino crime family. After the Apalachin Meeting in 1957, and the imprisonment of Vito Genovese in 1959, Gambino took over the Commission of the American Mafia until his death from a heart attack on October 15, 1976. During more than 50 years in organized crime, he served only 22 months in prison for a tax evasion charge in 1937.

Early life and family
Gambino was born in Palermo, Sicily, Italy, on August 24, 1902, to a family that belonged to a Sicilian Mafia gang from Passo di Rigano. He had two brothers, Gaspare Gambino, who was not involved with the Mafia, and Paolo Gambino who was a part of the Gambino crime family. His parents were Italian immigrants Tommaso Gambino and Felice Castellano.

Gambino entered the United States on December 23, 1921, at Norfolk, Virginia, as a stowaway on the SS Vincenzo Florio. He then joined his cousins, the Castellanos, in New York City. He had worked for a small trucking firm owned by his uncle's family.

Gambino later moved to a modest house located at 2230 Ocean Parkway in Brooklyn; his Long Island residence, located at 34 Club Drive in Massapequa, served as his summer home. The two-story brick house, surrounded by a low fence with marble statues on the front lawn, was at the end of a cul-de-sac in Harbor Green Estates, overlooking the South Oyster Bay. In 1932, Gambino married one of his cousins, Catherine Castellano, sister of Paul Castellano. They raised four children – sons Thomas, Joseph (March 28, 1936 – February 20, 2020) and Carlo (born 1934), and a daughter, Phyllis Gambino Sinatra (September 22, 1927 – February 19, 2007).

Castellammarese War and The Commission
Gambino was a part of a criminal organization headed by Joe Masseria. In 1930, Gambino was arrested in Lawrence, Massachusetts as a suspicious person. That charge was dismissed, but he was seized a month later in Brockton, Massachusetts, on a larceny charge. A warrant was issued for his arrest when he failed to show up in court. Four years later, he was arrested in Manhattan as a fugitive and was returned to Brockton, where the larceny charge was dropped when he made restitution of $1,000.

By the early 1930s, Masseria's main rival was boss Salvatore Maranzano, who had come from Sicily to run the Castellammarese clan. Their rivalry eventually escalated into the bloody Castellammarese War. Masseria and Maranzano were so-called "Mustache Petes": older, traditional Mafia bosses who had started their criminal careers in Italy. They believed in upholding the supposed "Old World Mafia" principles of "honor", "tradition", "respect", and "dignity". These bosses refused to work with non-Italians, and were skeptical of working with non-Sicilians. Some of the most conservative bosses worked with only men having roots in their own Sicilian village.

The war had been going poorly for Masseria, and Lucky Luciano saw an opportunity to switch allegiance. In a secret deal with Maranzano, Luciano agreed to engineer Masseria's death in return for receiving Masseria's rackets and becoming Maranzano's second-in-command. On April 15, 1931, Masseria was killed at Nuova Villa Tammaro, a Coney Island restaurant in Brooklyn. With Maranzano's blessing, Luciano took over Masseria's gang and became Maranzano's lieutenant, ending the Castellammarese War.

With Masseria gone, Maranzano reorganized the Italian American gangs in New York City into Five Families headed by Luciano, Profaci, Gagliano, Vincent Mangano and himself. Maranzano called a meeting of crime bosses in Wappingers Falls, New York, where he declared himself capo di tutti capi ("boss of all bosses"). Maranzano also whittled down the rival families' rackets in favor of his own. Luciano appeared to accept these changes, but was merely biding his time before removing Maranzano. Although Maranzano was slightly more forward-thinking than Masseria, Luciano had come to believe that Maranzano was even more greedy and hidebound than Masseria had been.

By September 1931, Maranzano realizing the threat Luciano posed, hired Irish hitman Vincent "Mad Dog" Coll, to eliminate him. However, Lucchese alerted Luciano that he was marked for death. On September 10, Maranzano summoned Luciano, Genovese and Costello to his office at 230 Park Avenue in Manhattan, where he was killed.

Later in 1931, Luciano called a meeting in Chicago with various bosses, where he proposed the creation of a governing body for organized crime that would later evolve into The Commission. Designed to settle all disputes and decide which families controlled which territories, the Commission has been called Luciano's greatest innovation. Luciano's goals with the Commission were to quietly maintain his own power over all the families, and to prevent future gang wars; the bosses approved the idea of the Commission.

Mangano family
After the death of Masseria, Gambino and his cousins became soldiers in the family headed by Vincent Mangano. Despite being a mob power in his own right, Albert Anastasia was nominally the underboss of the Mangano family. During Mangano's 20-year rule, Mangano had resented Anastasia's close ties to Luciano and Costello, particularly the fact that they had obtained Anastasia's services without first seeking Mangano's permission. This and other business disputes led to heated, almost physical fights between the two mobsters.

Gambino was arrested in 1937, and served 22 months in prison at Lewisburg for tax evasion related to operating a million‐gallon distillery in Philadelphia.

Mangano's brother Philip was found dead near Sheepshead Bay, Brooklyn on April 19, 1951. He was murdered along with his brother on the orders of Anastasia in Brooklyn in 1951. Vincent Mangano's body was never found and was declared dead 10 years later on October 30, 1961, by the Surrogate's Court in Brooklyn. No one was ever arrested in the Mangano murders, but it was widely assumed that Anastasia had them killed.

Anastasia murder
During the mid-1950s, Genovese decided to move against Frank Costello. However, Genovese needed to also remove Costello's strong ally on the Commission, Albert Anastasia, the boss of the Anastasia crime family. Genovese was soon conspiring with Gambino, Anastasia's underboss, to remove Anastasia.

In early 1957, Genovese decided to move on Costello. Genovese ordered Vincent Gigante to murder Genovese family boss Costello, and on May 2, 1957, Gigante shot and wounded Costello outside his apartment building. Although the wound was superficial, it persuaded Costello to relinquish power to Genovese and retire. A doorman identified Gigante as the gunman, however, in 1958, Costello testified that he was unable to recognize his assailant; Gigante was acquitted on charges of attempted murder.

With Costello gone, Genovese and Gambino allegedly ordered Anastasia's murder. Gambino gave the contract to Joe Profaci, who then allegedly gave it to the Gallo crew, headed by Joseph "Crazy Joe" Gallo, with Anastasia being murdered on October 25, 1957, in the barbershop of the Park Sheraton Hotel in Midtown Manhattan. Gambino then became the new boss of the Mangano crime family, which was renamed the Gambino crime family.

Gambino appointed Joseph Biondo as underboss, however, by 1965, he was replaced with Aniello Dellacroce.

Apalachin and Genovese's fall
In November 1957, immediately after the Anastasia murder, after taking control of the Luciano crime family from Costello, Genovese wanted to legitimize his new power by holding a national Cosa Nostra meeting. Genovese elected Buffalo, New York boss and Commission member, Stefano "The Undertaker" Magaddino, who in turn chose northeastern Pennsylvania crime boss Joseph Barbara and his underboss Russell Bufalino to oversee all the arrangements for the Apalachin meeting. Cuba was one of the Apalachin topics of discussion, particularly the gambling and narcotics smuggling interests of La Cosa Nostra on the island. The international narcotics trade was also an important topic on the Apalachin agenda. The New York garment industry interests and rackets, such as loansharking to the business owners and control of garment center trucking, were other important topics on the Apalachin agenda.

On November 14, 1957, powerful mafiosi from the United States and Italy convened at Barbara's estate in Apalachin, New York. The meeting agenda included the resolution of open questions on illegal gambling and narcotics dealing, particularly in the New York City area. State trooper Edgar D. Croswell had become aware that Barbara's son was reserving rooms in local hotels along with the delivery of a large quantity of meat from a local butcher to the Barbara home. That made Croswell suspicious, and he therefore decided to keep an eye on Barbara's house. When the state police found many luxury cars parked at Barbara's home they began taking down license plate numbers. Having found that many of these cars were registered to known criminals, state police reinforcements came to the scene and began to set up a roadblock. When the mobsters discovered the police presence, they started fleeing the gathering by car and by foot. Many Mafiosi escaped through the woods surrounding the Barbara estate; Gambino is thought to have attended the meeting, but was not one of the mobsters apprehended. The police stopped a car driven by Bufalino, whose passengers included Genovese and three other men, at a roadblock as they left the estate; Bufalino said that he had come to visit his sick friend, Barbara. Genovese said he was just there for a barbecue and to discuss business with Barbara. The police let him go.

Gambino and Luciano allegedly helped pay part of $100,000 to a Puerto Rican drug dealer to falsely implicate Genovese in a drug deal. On April 17, 1959, Genovese was sentenced to 15 years in prison for drug offenses, where he died on February 14, 1969.

On January 26, 1962, Luciano died of a heart attack at Naples International Airport. Three days later, 300 people attended a funeral service for Luciano in Naples. His body was conveyed along the streets of Naples in a horse-drawn black hearse. With the permission of the US government, Luciano's relatives took his body back to New York for burial. He was buried in St. John's Cemetery in Middle Village, Queens. More than 2,000 mourners attended his funeral. Gambino, Luciano's longtime friend, gave his eulogy.

Boss
After Genovese's imprisonment, Gambino subsequently took control of The Commission. Gambino despised drugs, and even though heroin and cocaine were highly lucrative, he thought that they would also attract attention. The punishment for a family member dealing drugs, in Gambino style, was death.

In the 1960s, the Gambino family had 500 soldiers and over 1,000 associates. In 1962, Carlo Gambino's oldest son, Thomas Gambino, married Tommy Lucchese's daughter Frances. Over 1,000 guests attended the wedding, at which Carlo Gambino presented Lucchese with a $30,000 gift. In return, Lucchese gave Gambino a part of his rackets at Idlewild Airport (now called John F. Kennedy Airport). Lucchese exercised control over airport management security and all the airport unions. As a team, Lucchese and Gambino now controlled the airport, the Commission, and most organized crime in New York City.

Conspiracy against the Commission
In 1963, Joseph Bonanno, the head of the Bonanno crime family, made plans to assassinate several rivals on the Mafia Commission—bosses Gambino, Tommy Lucchese, and Stefano Magaddino, as well as Frank DeSimone. Bonanno sought Joseph Magliocco's support, and Magliocco readily agreed.  Not only was he bitter from being denied a seat on the Commission, but Bonanno and Profaci had been close allies for over 30 years prior to Profaci's death. Bonanno's audacious goal was to take over the Commission and make Magliocco his right-hand man. Magliocco was assigned the task of killing Lucchese and Gambino, and gave the contract to one of his top hit men, Joseph Colombo. However, the opportunistic Colombo revealed the plot to its targets. The other bosses quickly realized that Magliocco could not have planned this himself.  Remembering how close Bonanno was with Magliocco (and before him, Profaci), as well as their close ties through marriages, the other bosses concluded Bonanno was the real mastermind. The Commission summoned Bonanno and Magliocco to explain themselves.  Fearing for his life, Bonanno went into hiding in Montreal, leaving Magliocco to deal with the Commission.  Badly shaken and in failing health, Magliocco confessed his role in the plot. The Commission spared Magliocco's life, but forced him to retire as Profaci family boss and pay a $50,000 fine. As a reward for turning on his boss, Colombo was awarded the Profaci family.

Health and deportation order
Deportation proceedings were started by the Immigration and Naturalization Service as early as 1953, but made no headway for several years because of Gambino's heart condition and constant hospitalizations. In 1970, he was indicted on charges of conspiring to hijack an armored car carrying $3 million, and was arrested on March 23, 1970. He was released on $75,000 bail, and was never brought to trial because of his health. The same year, the Supreme Court upheld a 1967 order, that he previously appealed, that he be deported because he had entered the country illegally. When the government tried to carry out the order, Gambino was rushed to a hospital after he had suffered a massive heart attack.

Colombo assassination
On June 28, 1971, Colombo was shot three times by Jerome A. Johnson, one being in the head, at the second Italian Unity Day rally in Columbus Circle sponsored by the Italian-American Civil Rights League; Johnson was immediately killed by Colombo's bodyguards. Colombo was paralyzed from the shooting, and later died in 1978.

Although many in the Colombo family blamed Joe Gallo for the shooting, the police eventually concluded that Johnson was a lone gunman after they had questioned Gallo. Since Johnson had spent time a few days earlier at a Gambino club, one theory was that Gambino organized the shooting. Colombo refused to listen to Gambino's complaints about the League, and allegedly spat in Gambino's face during one argument. However, the Colombo family leadership was convinced that Gallo ordered the murder after his falling out with the family. Gallo was murdered on April 7, 1972.

Tommy Eboli murder
After Genovese's death, Gerardo Catena became the new official boss. However, Catena was indicted and jailed in 1970. Thomas Eboli was then the "front boss" of the family for the next two years. However, Eboli wanted to be the real head of the Genovese family. To further his advancement, Eboli borrowed $4 million from the Commission chairman and head of the rival Gambino crime family, Carlo Gambino to fund a new drug trafficking operation. However, law enforcement soon shut down Eboli's drug racket and arrested most of his crew. Gambino and his underboss Aniello Dellacroce allegedly came to Eboli to get their money back, but he did not have it. Gambino then allegedly ordered Eboli's murder due to lack of payment. However, it is believed that Gambino actually wanted to replace Eboli with Gambino ally Frank "Funzi" Tieri, and that Gambino used the drug trafficking operation to set up Eboli. On July 16, 1972, Eboli left his girlfriend's apartment in Crown Heights, Brooklyn and walked to his chauffeured Cadillac car. As Eboli sat in the parked car, a gunman in a passing truck shot him five times. Hit in the head and neck, Eboli died instantly. No one was ever charged in this murder.

Death
Gambino died at his home in Massapequa in the early morning hours of Friday,  having watched the television broadcast of the  winning the American League pennant the previous evening. The official cause was natural causes, and his death was not unexpected, given a recent history of heart disease. Cusimano & Russo Funeral Home hosted his wake over the weekend of October 16 and 17.  His funeral mass was held on Monday, October 18, at the Church of Our Lady of Grace  Gambino was then entombed within his family's private room in the Cloister building of Saint John Cemetery in Queens. Gambino's funeral and wake were attended by several hundred people, with plainclothes police and FBI agents mingling outside. His funeral procession consisted of 13 limousines, around a dozen private cars, and one flower car.

Aftermath
Against expectations, he had previously appointed Castellano to succeed him over his underboss Dellacroce. Gambino appeared to believe that his crime family would benefit from Castellano's focus on white collar businesses. Dellacroce, at the time, was imprisoned for tax evasion and was unable to contest Castellano's succession.

Castellano's succession was confirmed at a meeting on November 24, with Dellacroce present. Castellano arranged for Dellacroce to remain as underboss while directly running traditional Cosa Nostra activities such as extortion, robbery, and loansharking. While Dellacroce accepted Castellano's succession, the deal effectively split the Gambino family into two rival factions.

In popular culture
In the 1995 TV film Between Love and Honor, Carlo Gambino is portrayed by Robert Loggia.
In the 1996 TV film Gotti, Carlo Gambino is portrayed by Marc Lawrence as the head of the Gambino family towards his death in 1976.
In the 2001 TV film Boss of Bosses, Carlo Gambino is portrayed by Al Ruscio. He was shown from his early years in the Cosa Nostra till his death, when Paul Castellano was chosen to succeed him. His younger self is portrayed by William DeMeo.
In the 2015 AMC mini series The Making of the Mob: New York, Carlo Gambino is portrayed by Noah Forrest.
In the 2018 biopic Gotti, Carlo Gambino is portrayed by Michael Cipiti.
 He is portrayed by Anthony Skordi on the 2022 TV series The Offer.
He is portrayed by Arthur J. Nascarella in Season 3 of TV Series Godfather of Harlem

Notes

References

External links

https://web.archive.org/web/20071203045421/http://www.americanmafia.com/images/Frank_Gambino284x152.jpg

 

1902 births
1976 deaths
American crime bosses
American gangsters
American gangsters of Sicilian descent
American gangsters of Italian descent
American Roman Catholics
Bosses of the Gambino crime family
Burials at St. John's Cemetery (Queens)
Capo dei capi
Gambino crime family
Italian emigrants to the United States
Italian crime bosses
People from Massapequa, New York
Gangsters from Palermo
Prohibition-era gangsters